The 1936 Benalla Centenary Race was a motor race staged at the Benalla Circuit at Benalla in Victoria, Australia on Easter Monday, 13 April 1936. The 100-mile race, which was organised by the Victorian Sporting Car Club, was open to cars of 'all powers'. It was contested on a handicap basis with the 'Limit Man', J O’Dea (MG), given a 20-minute start on the 'Scratch Man', Jack Day (Day Special"). The race, which was organised to celebrate the centenary of the town of Benalla, was claimed to be the first road race to be contested on the Victorian mainland.

B Dentry (Riley Special), was flagged in as the winner of the race but rechecks after protests had been lodged saw the victory awarded to Les Murphy (MG P-type). Further checks conducted overnight resulted in Vin Maloney (MG Magna) being declared the winner from Dentry and Murphy.

Race results

	
Notes:
 Attendance: More than 20,000
 Total race distance: 40 laps, 100 miles (160 km)	
 Number of starters: 18	
 Winner's race time: 1:47:27	
 Fastest time: Bob Lea-Wright (Terraplane), 1:39:14	
 Fastest lap: Jack Day (Day Special), 2:19, 65 mph

References

Benalla Centenary Race